The Singaporean television sitcom, Phua Chu Kang Pte Ltd, which aired on MediaCorp TV Channel 5, ran into eight seasons between 25 September 1997 and 11 February 2007, with a total of 167 episodes.

Season 1

Season 2
Phua Chu Kang Season 2 is the 28-episode second season of Phua Chu Kang, which aired on MediaCorp TV Channel 5 between 3 March 1999 to 8 September 1999.

Season 3
Phua Chu Kang Season 3 is the 26-episode third season of Phua Chu Kang.

Season 4
Phua Chu Kang Season 4 is the 25-episode fourth season of Phua Chu Kang.

Season 5
Phua Chu Kang Season 5 is the 22 episode fifth season of Phua Chu Kang, which aired on MediaCorp TV Channel 5 between 5 November 2002 to 15 April 2003.

Season 6
Phua Chu Kang Season 6 is the 15-episode sixth season of Phua Chu Kang, which aired on MediaCorp TV Channel 5 between 21 October 2003 to 27 January 2004.

Season 7
Phua Chu Kang Season 7 is the 16 episode seventh season of Phua Chu Kang Pte Ltd, a Singaporean sitcom which aired on MediaCorp TV Channel 5 between 16 November 2004 to 1 March 2005.

Season 8
Phua Chu Kang Season 8 is the 14-episode eighth and final season of Phua Chu Kang, which aired on MediaCorp TV Channel 5 between 31 October 2006 to 11 February 2007.

References

Lists of Singaporean television series episodes
Lists of sitcom episodes